Pyrography or pyrogravure is the free handed art of decorating wood or other materials with burn marks resulting from the controlled application of a heated object such as a poker. It is also known as pokerwork or wood burning.

It can be practiced using specialized modern pyrography tools, or using a metal implement heated in a fire, or even sunlight concentrated with a magnifying lens. "Pyrography dates from the 17th century and reached its highest standard in the 19th century. In its crude form it is pokerwork."

Pyrography is also popular among gourd crafters and artists, where designs are burned onto the exterior of a dried hard-shell gourd.

History  

Pyrographer Robert Boyer hypothesizes that the art form dates back to prehistory when early humans created designs using the charred remains of their fires. It was known in China from the time of the Han dynasty, where it was known as "Fire Needle Embroidery". During the Victorian era, the invention of pyrography machines sparked a widespread interest in the craft, and it was at this time that the term "pyrography" was coined (previously the name "pokerwork" had been most widely used) In the late 19th century, a Melbourne architect by the name of Alfred Smart discovered that water-based paint could be applied hot to wood by pumping benzoline fumes through a heated hollow platinum pencil. This improved the pokerwork process by allowing the addition of tinting and shading that were previously impossible. In the early 20th century, the development of the electric pyrographic hot wire wood etching machine further automated the pokerwork process, and Art Nouveau pyrographic gloveboxes and other works were popular in that era. Pyrography is a traditional folk art in many parts of Europe, including Romania, Poland, Hungary, and Flanders, as well as Argentina and other areas in South America.

Equipment
Traditional pyrography can be performed using any heated metal implement. Modern pyrography machines exist, and can be divided into three main categories.

A large range of tones and shades can be achieved. Varying the type of tip used, the temperature, or the way the iron is applied to the material all create different effects. After the design is burned in, wooden objects are often coloured.

Solid-point burners
Solid-point burners are similar in design to a soldering iron. They have a solid brass tip which is heated by an electrical element, and operate at a fixed temperature.

Wire-nib burners
Wire-nib burners have variable temperature controls. The writing nib is heated by an electric current passing directly through it. Some models have interchangeable nibs to allow for different effects.

Laser cutters
Laser cutters can be set to scorch the material instead of cutting all the way through it.  Many laser cutters provide software facilities to import image files and transfer them onto a sheet of wood.  Some laser systems are sufficiently sensitive to perform pyrography on thin card or even paper.

Woods 
Woods differ in hardness, grain, figure, texture, color, and other physical characteristics.

Hardness: All woods can be classified into hard or soft. Usually softwoods are from coniferous (needle-leaved) trees.

Hardwoods are from broad-leaved trees. These hardwood trees can be classified into two distinct growing seasons each year (hot and cold season or a wet and dry season) such as:
 Earlywood: normally lighter in color and weight and only moderately strong
 Latewood: usually heavier, darker, and much stronger.

Softwood will burn faster than a hardwood does. It does not require very hot temperature to burn as do the hardwoods. 

Light-coloured hardwoods such as sycamore, basswood, beech and birch are most commonly used, as their fine grain is not obtrusive. However, other woods, such as maple, pine or oak, are also used. 

Grain: Grain is the direction of the fibrous elements of the wood cells. This is important to sand with the grain. Also the grain can cause deviation from its intended path with use of woodturning pen unless you apply more pressure and burn slower on the grain.

Figure: This is the natural design, or pattern, that you can see on the cut surface of the wood. The figure present on the wood should always be taken into consideration when you are planning your woodburned design. 

Texture: There is a texture on the surface of that wood that feels either coarse or fine, even or uneven. 

Woodburners typically avoid using very fine or intricate designs on uneven, coarse-textured wood. Softwoods are more apt to be fine or moderately coarse-textured. 

Color: Woodburning is mainly used to enhance the natural beauty of a wooden project, so woodburners take precious care not to obfuscate a beautiful figure, grain, luster, or color by over-charring.

Leather 

Pyrography is also applied to leather items, using the same hot-iron technique. Leather lends itself to bold designs, and also allows very subtle shading to be achieved. Specialist vegetable-tanned leather must be used for pyrography (as modern tanning methods leave chemicals in the leather which are toxic when burned), typically in light colours for good contrast.

Safety 
Extremely fine wood dust is liberated when sanding wood. All wood dust is hazardous, can cause respiratory problems. For this reason, many woodburners wear quality dust masks/respirators while power carving, and use a good dust collection system to prevent indoor air pollution.

There are serious risks associsted with burning pressure-treated wood. It is treated with chemicals that, although safely bound in the wood fibers for construction purposes, are inherently dangerous to woodworkers and woodburners when liberated through sanding or vaporized by heat. Similar dangers are inherent to stained, painted or sealed wood. A well ventilated room with a running fan will encourage air circulation and displace lingering smoke.

Fractal burning is a specific pyrography technique that can be extremely dangerous and has resulted in many documented deaths.

Gallery

References

External links 

 Malek Parvaneh - excellence in pyrography 
 Pyrography School - showing how it's done
 Pyrography.net
 Pyrography tips and techniques
 Draw with Fire. The Art of Pyrography Stefania Mante
  Davide Della Noce pyrography
  Giuseppe Apollonio
 - Etsuko Ichikawa, using molten glass 
 - Michael Turley Pyrographic Portraits on Reclaimed Wood
 Giusy Busco pyrography art
 Pyrography 101 Tutorial's by Nedra Denison
 The Wood Burn Book by Rachel Strauss

Artistic techniques
Woodworking
Writing implements